Arghandab is a river in Afghanistan, about  in length. In its lower course, it is much used for irrigation, under the control of the Helmand and Arghandab Valley Authority, and the valley is cultivated and populous; yet the water is said to be somewhat brackish. The Tarnak, which flows south of Kandahar, is much shorter (length about 320 km or 200 miles) and less copious.

Historical background 

The river was known to the ancient Iranians as Haraxvaiti in Avestan and Harahuvati in Old Persian, which are cognate with Rigvedic Sarasvati (as described in its "family books"). Scholars such as Boyce and Parpola have identified Greek Arachosia as a Hellenization of the name, meaning the land of Haraxvaiti. Rigveda's hymn VI.61.2 describes it with the words:

Historian Asko Parpola states: "Arghandab [...] descends from a height of nearly four kilometers down to about 700 meters when it joins the Helmand River, which eventually forms shallow lakes." Sarasvatī- is interpreted to mean "full of lakes".

Some historians, however, assert that the Avestan Haraxvaiti as well as the Rigvedic Sarasvati refer to the Helmand River. The Rigvedic name of Arghandab is then believed to be Drishadvati.

The ruins at Ulan Robat, supposed to represent the city Arachosia, are in its basin; and the lake known as Ab-i Istada, the most probable representative of Lake Arachotus, is near the head of the Tarnak, though not communicating with it. The Tarnak is dammed for irrigation at intervals, and in the hot season almost dries up.

Upper course 

The upper course of the Arghandab river is relatively unexplored. The Historical and Political Gazetteer of Afghanistan cites the explorations of Major G. Lynch in 1841,
according to whom the origin of the Arghandab is 20 to 30 miles north of Sang-e-Masha. This places the source in the mountains southwest of the Nawar basin. Lynch also described the upper course of the river as being a "mountain torrent, dashing over great granite rocks and about 3 feet deep where fordable".

Lower course 

There is a good deal of cultivation along the river, but few villages. The Kabul-Kandahar Highway passes this way (another reason for supposing the Tarnak to be Arachotus), and the people live off the road to avoid the onerous duties of hospitality.

Dahla dam 
In 2008 a project was initiated to rehabilitate the Dahla Dam and associated irrigation system.

See also
 List of rivers of Afghanistan

Notes

References

Bibliography

External links

 Distance Learning Module 3 - Rivers of the Hindu Kush, Pamir, and Hindu Raj, the University of Nebraska, Center for Afghanistan Studies, Retrieved 15 April 2018.

Rivers of Afghanistan
Helmand River drainage basin
Helmand River
Landforms of Helmand Province
Landforms of Kandahar Province
Landforms of Ghazni Province